Karen King may refer to:

 Karen Leigh King (born 1954), historian of religion
 Karen D. King (born 1970), African-American mathematics educator